Grasso is a surname, and may refer to:
 Alexa Grasso (born 1993), Mexican mixed martial artist
 Domenico Grasso (born 1955), American engineer and educator
 Ella Grasso (1919–1981), American politician
 Francis Grasso (1949–2001), American disc jockey
 Pietro Grasso (born 1945), Italian politician
 Richard Grasso (born 1946), Chairman and chief executive of the New York Stock Exchange 
 Thomas J. Grasso (1962–1995), American double murderer executed by lethal injection

Place 
 Mistralian norm for Grasse